Ivan Kolev (born 17 April 1951) is a Bulgarian former wrestler who competed in the 1972 Summer Olympics and in the 1976 Summer Olympics.  He was also active in the world championships.  In the 1973 World Championship he finished: 74.0 kg. Greco-Roman (1st).  In the 1973 European Championship he finished: 74.0 kg. Greco-Roman (1st).  In the 1974 European Championship he finished: 74.0 kg. Greco-Roman (1st); 1975 European Championship: 74.0 kg. Greco-Roman (6th).

References

External links
 

1951 births
Living people
Olympic wrestlers of Bulgaria
Wrestlers at the 1972 Summer Olympics
Wrestlers at the 1976 Summer Olympics
Bulgarian male sport wrestlers
Olympic bronze medalists for Bulgaria
Olympic medalists in wrestling
Medalists at the 1976 Summer Olympics
20th-century Bulgarian people
21st-century Bulgarian people